Rene Pauritsch (born 4 December 1964) is an Austrian football manager and former player who played as a forward.

Managerial career
Pauritsch was appointed manager of the Liechtenstein national team in 2012, succeeding Hans-Peter Zaugg.

At the end of 2018, Pauritsch left his role as manager to become the sporting director for Liechtenstein's national team. Previously, this role was part of the manager job, but this was split as part of the LFV's 2021 strategy

In March 2023, after Martin Stocklasa left the Liechtenstein national team to become manager of FC Vaduz, it was announced that Pauritsch would manage the team for their UEFA Euro 2024 qualifying matches against Portugal and Iceland.

References

Managerial statistics

External links
Liechtensteiner Fussballverbund
Die Elf, documentary film about Liechtenstein national team

1964 births
Living people
Austrian footballers
Association football forwards
DSV Leoben players
Grazer AK players
Austrian football managers
SC Austria Lustenau managers
Austrian expatriate football managers
Austrian expatriate sportspeople in Liechtenstein
Expatriate football managers in Liechtenstein
Liechtenstein national football team managers